Affinity4 is an American for-profit company that raises funds for nonprofit organizations through an affinity marketing partnership. Based in Virginia Beach, Virginia, Affinity4 has raised nearly $100 million for charities and ministries such as Feed the Children, Focus on the Family, and the American Center for Law & Justice.

History
The predecessor to Affinity4, LifeLine Communications, was founded in 1992, and utilized sales of long distance telephone service to raise funds for nonprofit organizations.

Name Change
In April 2005, LifeLine Communications announced that it was changing its name to Affinity4 to reflect the company's values: people can make a difference by donating a portion of every day purchases to charities, ministries, and nonprofit organizations. The same year, Affinity4 moved its headquarters from Oklahoma City, Oklahoma to Norfolk, Virginia.

Services
Affinity4 launched its first product, long distance telephone service, followed closely by Affinity4 Internet Service, as well as other products like wireless service, roadside assistance programs, a savings program, and more.

In June 2010, Affinity4's parent company, BN Media, purchased Beliefnet from NewsCorp and maintains a separate advisory board from Affinity4.

In September 2016, Patheos.com was added to the family of brands.

GiveBack Program
Pursuant to Affinity4's GiveBack Program, Affinity4 donates up to 10% of the proceeds it receives from customers that purchase Affinity4 products and services to each customer's designated nonprofit organization.

Partner Organizations
Affinity4 partners with charities, ministries, and other nonprofit organizations.

Board of directors
•	Stephen D. Halliday
•	Jay Sekulow
•	John Kingston

References

External links
 Affinity4

Companies based in Virginia Beach, Virginia
Financial services companies established in 1992
Charity fundraisers
1992 establishments in Virginia